Adam is the name of three rural localities in the Udmurt Republic, Russia:
Adam, Karsovaysky Selsoviet, Balezinsky District, Udmurt Republic, a village in Karsovaysky Selsoviet of Balezinsky District
Adam, Voyegurtsky Selsoviet, Balezinsky District, Udmurt Republic, a village in Voyegurtsky Selsoviet of Balezinsky District
Adam, Glazovsky District, Udmurt Republic, a village in Adamsky Selsoviet of Glazovsky District